Craig Neil Harrington (born 20 December 1982) is an English football manager who managed Club América in the Liga MX Femenil since June 2021.

Between 2010 and 2013, Harrington worked as a coach at the LA Galaxy Academy. In December 2013, he was named the technical Director and head coach of the Turks and Caicos national football team.

Career 
Harrington was put in charge of the Turks and Caicos national football team ahead of the 2014 Caribbean Cup qualification campaign.

In 2018, Harrington became an assistant coach of Chicago Red Stars of the National Women's Soccer League.

On 7 February 2020 Harrington was named the head coach of Utah Royals FC in the National Women's Soccer League. On 9 November 2020 the Salt Lake Tribune reported sources saying that Harrington was placed on leave after players complained he was being “verbally abusive,” a charge Harrington denied. Harrington and the club parted ways. 

On 4 June 2021 Harrington was appointed as manager of Club América in the Liga MX Femenil. Harrington was immediately fired after the team was eliminated on the quarter-finals by Club Pachuca on May of 2022.

On 9 January 2023, Harrington was given a two-year ban from the NWSL for his abusive conduct in his coaching career, with future employment in the league conditional on meeting a set of requirements.

References 

1982 births
Living people
People from Hillingdon
English football managers
LA Galaxy non-playing staff
Expatriate football managers in the Turks and Caicos Islands
Turks and Caicos Islands national football team managers
National Women's Soccer League coaches
Chicago Red Stars non-playing staff
Club América (women) managers
Utah Royals FC coaches